Robert Elliott (June 2, 1944December 25, 2004) was an American actor. He is known for his roles in the movies Animal House (1978), Flashpoint (1984) and Vixen Highway (2001). He died on December 25, 2004, in Tucson, Arizona.

References

External links 
 

1944 births
2004 deaths
American male film actors
Male actors from Arizona
20th-century American male actors